Joseph Berrini (14 October 1918 – 2005) was an Italian-French racing cyclist. He rode in the 1947 Tour de France.

References

External links
 

1918 births
2005 deaths
French male cyclists
Italian male cyclists
Place of birth missing
Cyclists from the Province of Varese
Italian emigrants to France